KCLZ (95.5 FM) is a radio station broadcasting a mainstream rock music format, simulcasting KCLB 93.7 FM Coachella, California. Licensed to Twentynine Palms, California, United States, the station is currently owned by Alpha Media LLC, through licensee Alpha Media Licensee LLC.

On September 22, 2016, KCLZ was granted a Federal Communications Commission construction permit to increase the effective radiated power to 6,000 watts.

History
The Federal Communications Commission issued a construction permit for the station to Desert Willow Broadcasters on February 5, 1993. The station was assigned the call sign KHWX on March 12, 1993, and changed its call sign to KKJT on July 22, 1994. The station received its license to cover on October 21, 1996. On October 6, 1997, the station's license was assigned by Desert Willow to Three D Radio, Inc. On January 26, 1999, the station changed its call sign to KDHI. Following a bankruptcy filing by Three D, the station's license was assigned on July 6, 2004, to Copper Mountain Broadcasting. The price for the transaction, which included the license for sister station KKJT, was $350,000. The station changed its call sign to the current KCLZ on January 3, 2014.

On October 20, 2011, KQCM and its CHR format moved from 92.1 FM Joshua Tree, CA (now KKCM, simulcasting country-formatted KXCM 96.3 FM Twentynine Palms, CA) to 95.5 FM Twentynine Palms, CA (new frequency that just signed on the air).

On January 1, 2014, KQCM and its CHR format moved to 105.3 FM Twentynine Palms, CA (formerly talk-formatted KRSX-FM), while the 95.5 FM frequency became a simulcast of mainstream rock-formatted KCLB 93.7 FM Coachella, CA, under new calls, KCLZ.

On May 21, 2015, Morris Communications' MCC Radio, LLC closed on its acquisition of KCLZ in exchange for KFSQ.

Morris Communications sold KCLZ and thirty-two other stations to Alpha Media LLC effective September 1, 2015, at a purchase price of $38.25 million.

References

External links

CLZ
Radio stations established in 1996
Alpha Media radio stations